Gibberula gruveli is a species of very small sea snail, a marine gastropod mollusk or micromollusk in the family Cystiscidae.

Description

Distribution
This marine species occurs off Namibia.

References

 Dautzenberg, P., 1912. Mission GRUVEL sur la côte occidentale d'Afrique (1909-1910), Mollusques marins. Annales de l'Institut Océanographique "1913"5(3): 111 p, 3 pls
 Gofas, S., 1989. Le genre Volvarina (Marginellidae) dans la Méditerranée et l'Atlantique du nord-est. Bollettino Malacologico 25(5-8): 159-182

Cystiscidae
Gastropods described in 1913